Penrith Association Football Club is a football club based in Penrith, Cumbria, England. They play in the Northern Football League Division One.

History

Founded in 1894. They originally joined the North Eastern League in 1907–08, and are currently members of the Northern League Division One.

The club joined the Northern League in 1947, spending 35 years in that competition until moving to the North West Counties League in 1982. A five-season spell in that league (including finishing as league runners-up in their first season) saw them in a position to join the Northern Premier League when they expanded to form a second division in 1987.

The move to the NPL did not prove successful, and by 1990 they were relegated back to the North West Counties League, where they stayed for seven seasons before returning once more to the Northern League, fifteen years after originally leaving that league.

In 1981–82, they had their best ever FA Cup run, reaching the second round, beating Football League club Chester in the first round.

In 2007, they changed their name to Penrith Town, but a merger a year later with Northern Football Alliance club Penrith United saw the old name resurrected for the merged club.
Since then they have continued to play in The Northern League.

In 2008 the club saw its ground at Southend Rd earmarked for development and a new stadium was built at Frenchfield Park with the first home game played on August 4, 2009.

Since moving there the club has carried out significant improvements to the facilities and now has a very modern and picturesque stadium.

Honours
Northern League Division One
Runners-up 1961–62
Northern League Division Two
Champions 2002–03
North West Counties League Premier Division
Runners-up 1983–84
Cumberland Senior Cup
Winners (3): 2000–01, 2005–06, 2009–10
Runners-up (8): 1991–92, 1994–95, 2003–04, 2007–08, 2008–09, 2016–17, 2017–18, 2018 -19

Records
FA Cup
Second Round 1981–82
FA Trophy
First Round 1980–81, 1982–83
FA Vase
Third Round 1991–92, 1993–94, 2008–09, 2009–10

References

 
Northern Football League
Football clubs in Cumbria
North West Counties Football League clubs
Northern Premier League clubs
1894 establishments in England
Football clubs in England
North Eastern League